Eglinton GO Station is a train station that serves the Scarborough Village and Eglinton East neighbourhoods of Toronto, Ontario, Canada.  It is a station on the Lakeshore East line of the GO Transit rail network. This station is one of few GO stations that are not accessible yet.

History
The station opened to the public in 1967. The current station building was built in 1978, and was renovated in 2000.

On September 23, 2021, construction started to make the station accessible. The enhancements will include four new elevators and stairwells linking to the two existing pedestrian tunnels. Completion of the work is expected in 2024.

Connecting transit
Toronto Transit Commission buses can be boarded on Eglinton Avenue East at the intersection with Bellamy Road North.
9 Bellamy
86 Scarborough
116 Morningside
905 Eglinton East Express

References

External links

GO Transit railway stations
Railway stations in Toronto
Transport in Scarborough, Toronto
Railway stations in Canada opened in 1967
1967 establishments in Ontario